Maccabi Ironi Ramat Gan (formerly Ironi Ramat Gan) is a male basketball club based in Ramat Gan in central Israel. The team plays in Liga Leumit, the second division in Israeli basketball. It plays at the Shalom Zisman Municipal sports Arena, which has a seating capacity for 1,400.

History
Maccabi Ramat Gan basketball club was formed in 1946. Since 1968 it became permanent in the first league.

In 1972 it lost in the cup final to Maccabi Tel Aviv, 108:99, with Ramat Gan’s star , Belgium Born, Kamil dirks scoring a still unbroken cup final record of 43 points.

In the seasons 1972-3 and 1972-3, it finished second in the league.

Same happened on the 1982-3 season.

It’s all -time leading scorer, Doron Jamchi, made his first steps in 1978, he left to Maccabi Tel Aviv in 1985, after incredible years, with him being the league leading scorer several seasons . 

In 1987-8 the club lost again to Maccabi Tel Aviv at the cup final 107:85.

In the 1996-7 season , After increasing pressure from the city mayor,  Maccabi Ramat Gan merged
With another team , Beitar Ramat Gan now called Maccabi Ironi Ramat Gan. 

In 2001-2 it finished the season only second the Maccabi Tel Aviv , the champion.

In 2009–10 the team dropped down to Liga Leumit after losing the relegation playoff in the Super League.

Notable players
To appear in this section a player must have either:
 Set a club record or won an individual award as a professional player.
 Played at least one official international match for his senior national team or one NBA game at any time.

David Bernsley (born 1969), American-Israeli
Erez Markovich (born 1978), Israeli

See also
:Category:Ironi Ramat Gan players

References

Basketball teams in Israel
Sport in Ramat Gan
Liga Leumit (basketball) teams
Basketball teams established in 1970
1970 establishments in Israel